Sergiy Stakhovsky was the defending champion but chose to compete in the 2011 Aegon International.

Unseeded Dmitry Tursunov won the tournament beating Ivan Dodig 6–3, 6–2 in the final.

Seeds

Qualifying draw

Draw

Finals

Top half

Bottom half

References
Main Draw

UNICEF Open - Men's Singles